"Gonesville" is a song by Bob Weir, which is the second single from his third solo album, Blue Mountain. Written by Weir in collaboration with members of The National; Josh Ritter, Josh Kaufman, Scott Devendorf, Joe Russo, and The Walkmen's Walter Martin, along with lyricists Gerrit Graham and John Perry Barlow. The producers are Josh Kaufman and Daniel Goodwin.

"Gonesville" premiered on Rolling Stone's website for streaming. "Gonesville," is a bouncy, sing-along track that was co-written by Josh Ritter.

Elias Leight, from Rolling Stone, described the song as "Weir and his band shambling cheerfully here: The bass line hints at the verve of honky tonk, the harmonica scoots forward and the lead guitar spits lively licks. A raft of backing vocalists join in during the chorus, adding to the cool, festive air, and "Gonesville" comes to a close with a jaunty group chant."

Speaking about the inspiration for song, Weir described the song as "being a take on a Rockabilly tune. I was trying to go back and channel Elvis for the vocal, and for the music as well."

Musicians
Bob Weir – Vocals, Guitar
Aaron Dessner – Electric Guitar
Scott Devendorf – Bass, Vocals
Joe Russo – drums, harmonium, harmonica, backup vocals
Josh Kaufman – lyrics
Rob Burger – keyboard, accordion, tuned percussion

References

Songs written by Bob Weir
2016 songs